Michal Navrátil (born 5 June 1985) is a Czech professional diver.

Personal life
Michal Navrátil was born in Prague, Czechoslovakia. Originally his family come from Pilzen, Bohemia.

His father introduced him to swimming competitions from the young age of five, he swam in the Nationals where he earned a 2nd-place finish in the 50m butterfly.

As an born athlete also competed in gymnastic competitions in club of Sparta Prague at the age of 10 after that he started his diver career in Sport Club USK Podoli where he earned a second-place finish in the Nationals on the 1 and 3 meter boards. In European competitions he was trained by Hana Novotna.
Michal's favorite dive is the triple somersault with half twist from 28 meters.
 When you are up on the platform, you feel the high and the fear that you need to learn control - you must be fearless.

Highdiving career

National Championships
Every last weekend of July and is located in the quarry of Hřiměždice in Central Bohemian Region
2002 1st place 12 and 16 meters
2003 2nd place 12 and 16 meters 
2004 1st place 12 and 16 meters
2005 1st 16 meters
2006 2nd 12 meters
2007 1st place 12 and 16 meters
2009 1st place 12 and 16 meters

Mediterranean Championships - Marmeeting
This international sport event is located in Furore, Italy and is every year in first Sunday of July.
2008 7th
2011 1st

European Championships
Located in a small valley in the Swiss Italian mountains in Ponte Brolla in Switzerland. 
Presented by WHDF World High Diving Federation every year in finals of July.

Cliffdiving career
Started with the annual Red Bull World Wide Series   - Cliff Diving competition which draws hundreds of spectators to the sites around the world, watchers hold their collective breath as the competitors take off from rocks and platforms set high on cliffs at 27 or 28 meters.

2011 World Wide Series
Qualification Results: 1st Australia - Hawkesbury River

Results Stop 1: 5th Chile  - Easter Island 
Results Stop 2: 5th Mexico - Yucatan 
Results Stop 3: 3rd Greece - Athens      
Results Stop 4: 2nd France- La Rochelle 
Results Stop 5: 3rd Italy - Polignano a Mare 
Results Stop 6: 12th United States - Boston

Finals: 3rd Ukraine - Yalta

World Series Standings 2011

1.	Gary Hunt	    GBR	
2.	Artem Silchenko	    RUS 
3.	Michal Navrátil CZE 
4.	Slava Polyeshchuk UKR 
5.	Cyrille Oumedjkane FRA	
6.	Alain Kohl	    LUX	
7.	Sacha Kutsenko	    UKR	
8.	Orlando Duque COL 
9.	Kent De Mond	    USA	
10.	Steven LoBue	    USA	
11.	Jorge Ferzuli	    MEX	
12.	Hassan Mouti	    FRA

Performing career

2009
He trained and performed for one year in Shenzhen Xiaomeisha Sea World in China. 
China's leading marine-based theme park and entertainment complex that has attracted millions of visitors since opening in 1998.

2010
Gain contract with Royal Caribbean which is the most exclusive and largest luxury cruise lines in the world.
Performing in the diving and acrobatics show, Aqua Aria at the AquaTheater, the world first amphitheater at sea.

Cinematography career
Performed in mainstream movies  
2004 Jedna ruka netleska (CZ)
2007 Wanted (USA)
2007 Babylon A.D. (CAD)

References

External links
Navrátil's Website
WORLD HIGH DIVING FEDERATION 
Pictures at Telegraph.co.uk
Nytimes.com article

Living people
Czech male divers
1985 births
Male high divers
World Aquatics Championships medalists in high diving
Sportspeople from Prague